The Alliant Destiny Fusion is an American two-seat powered parachute, designed and produced by Alliant Aviation based at Richland, Michigan.

Design and development
The aircraft was designed to comply with the FAI Microlight rules. It features a parachute-style high-wing and two-seats in tandem in a semi-stressed fibreglass cockpit, tricycle landing gear and a single  Rotax 503 engine in pusher configuration. Versions were also available with a Rotax 582 or Hirth 3701 engine.

Specifications (Rotax 503)

References

2000s United States ultralight aircraft
Single-engined pusher aircraft
Powered parachutes
Alliant aircraft